Events in the year 1971 in Norway.

Incumbents
 Monarch – Olav V
 Prime Minister – Per Borten (Centre Party) until 17 October, Trygve Bratteli (Labour Party)

Events

 Municipal and county elections are held throughout the country.
 17 March – Bratteli's First Cabinet was appointed.
 22 May – The crew quarters of the Norwegian passenger ship MS Meteor catches on fire outside Vancouver, British Columbia, Canada. 32 people of the ship's crew are killed in the event.
 22 September – Princess Märtha Louise of Norway is born.

Popular culture

Sports

Music

Film

Literature
Per Arneberg, poet, prosaist and translator is awarded the Riksmål Society Literature Prize.
Gunvor Hofmo, writer and poet, is awarded the Norwegian Critics Prize for Literature for Gjest på jorden (Guest on Earth).
Stein Mehren, poet, novelist, essayist and playwright, is awarded the Dobloug Prize literature award.
Arild Nyquist, novelist, poet, children's writer and musician, is awarded the Mads Wiel Nygaard's Endowment literary prize.

Notable births
 
 

1 February – Harald Brattbakk, footballer and pilot
18 February – May Britt Lagesen, politician.
18 March – Hilde Synnøve Lid, freestyle skier.
24 March – Bengt Rune Strifeldt, politician.
3 April – Ingvild Vaggen Malvik, politician
5 April – Åslaug Sem-Jacobsen, politician.
6 April – Mona Grudt, model and 1990 Miss Universe
13 May – Espen Lind, songwriter, producer, singer, and multi-instrumentalist
16 May – Pia Wedege, luger.
15 June – Vibeke Larsen, politician.
28 June – Dagrun Eriksen, politician
20 July – Guro Angell Gimse, politician 
9 September – Ann Cathrin Eriksen, handball player.
29 September – Frida Melvær, politician.
2 October – Anette Igland, footballer
5 October – Ole Robert Reitan, businessperson.
18 October – Line Henriette Holten Hjemdal, politician
17 November – Tonje Sagstuen, handball player.
22 November – Geir Hartly Andreassen, cinematographer
22 November – Gunnar Wærness, poet.
2 December – Linn T. Sunne, children's writer.
10 December – Arnfinn Kristiansen, bobsledder.

Notable deaths
 
 
 

16 January – Halfdan Gran Olsen, rower and Olympic bronze medallist (b.1910)
29 January – Bjarne Guldager, sprinter (b.1897)
31 January – Gunnar Jahn, jurist, economist and politician (b.1883)
24 February – Hartvig Svendsen, politician (b.1902)
1 March – Harald Damsleth, cartoonist, illustrator and ad-man (b.1906)
1 April – Hans Svarstad, politician (b.1883)
2 May – Olaf Barda, chess player, first Norwegian International Master (b.1909)
24 May – Haakon Hansen, politician (b.1907)
2 June – Per Mathiesen, gymnast and Olympic gold medallist (b.1885)
26 June – Halvor Birkeland, sailor and Olympic gold medallist (b.1894)
16 July – Birger Brandtzæg, merchant and owner of a fishing station (born 1893).
19 July – Hans Kristian Bromstad, politician (b.1903)
20 July – Olaf Ingebretsen, gymnast and Olympic bronze medallist (b.1892)
6 August – Finn Moe, politician (b.1902).
19 August – Arthur Sundt, politician (b.1899)
4 September – Bjarne Lyngstad, politician and Minister (b.1901)
29 September – Johannes Lid, botanist (b.1886).
5 October – Marit Hemstad, sprinter (b.1928)
5 October – Marit Øiseth, cross country skier (b.1928)
17 October – Leif Grøner, banker and politician (b.1884)
22 October – Håkon Ellingsen, rower and Olympic bronze medallist (b.1894)
18 November – Leif Bjorholt Burull, politician (b.1895)
2 December – Erling Viksjø, architect (born 1910).
10 December – Arne Langset, politician (b.1893)
12 December – Kristian Johan Bodøgaard, politician (b.1885)

Full date unknown
Thorstein John Ohnstad Fretheim, politician (b.1886)
Johs Haugerud, politician (b.1896)
Nils Hønsvald, politician and Minister (b.1899)
Nic. Stang, art historian and writer (b.1908)
Julius Sundsvik, novelist and newspaper editor (b.1891)

See also

References

External links